Xylophagaidae is a family of deep-sea woodboring bivalve molluscs, similar to shipworms.

List of genera 
The Xylophagaidae family contains seven genera: 

 Abditoconus Voight, 2019 
 Feaya Voight, 2019 
 Spiniapex Voight, 2019 
 Xylonora Romano, 2020 
 Xylophaga W. Turton, 1822 
 Xylopholas R. D. Turner, 1972 
 Xyloredo R. D. Turner, 1972

References 

Myida
Bivalve families